Merfyn Lloyd Turner (20 October 1915 – 6 August 1991) was a Welsh prison social worker and author. In World War II he
was refused recognition as a conscientious objector, which led in turn to his refusing to submit to a medical examination as an essential preliminary to call-up; for this refusal he was sentenced to three months imprisonment, giving him a life-long concern for prison reform. On release from prison, he was allowed registration as a conscientious objector, and joined the Pacifist Service Unit in Tiger Bay, Cardiff.  In 1944 he moved to the settlement Oxford House, Bethnal Green, joining fellow conscientious objectors Guy Clutton-Brock, John Raven and Peter Kuenstler. In 1954, he opened Norman House as a halfway home for people leaving prison.

He appeared as a castaway on the BBC Radio programme Desert Island Discs on 30 July 1962.

Bibliography

Papers

References 

1915 births
1991 deaths
British conscientious objectors
British social workers
Prison reformers
People from Penygraig